Hadiza Mailafia is a Nigerian politician. She served as the Minister of Environment from July 2011 to September 2013.

References 

Living people
21st-century Nigerian politicians
21st-century Nigerian women politicians
Government ministers of Nigeria
Women government ministers of Nigeria
Environment ministers
Year of birth missing (living people)